Helle is both a feminine given name and a surname. In Scandinavia, it is a variant of the feminine given name Helga. Notable people with the name include:

Given name
Helle Aro (born 1960), Estonian heptathlete
Helle Crafts (1947–1986), Danish murder victim
Helle Fagralid (born 1976), Danish actress
Helle Frederiksen (born 1981), Danish professional triathlete
Helle-Reet Helenurm (1944–2003), Estonian actress
Helle-Moonika Helme (born 1966), Estonian musician and politician
Helle Kalda (born 1950), Estonian politician
Helle Klein (born 1966), Swedish journalist
Helle Kuningas (1949–2014), Estonian actress
Helle Meri (born 1949), Estonian actress, former First Lady of Estonia
Helle Metslang (born 1950), Estonian linguist
Helle Michaelsen (born 1968), Danish model
Helle Rotbøll (born 1963), Danish footballer
Helle Stangerup (1939–2015), Danish novelist
Helle Thorning-Schmidt (born 1966), Prime Minister of Denmark (2011–2015)
Helle Trevino (born 1975), Danish IFBB professional bodybuilder
Helle Virkner (1925–2009), Danish actress

Surname
 Henri Helle (1873–1901), French archer
 Soini Helle (1914–1992), Finnish chess player
 Veikko Helle (1911–2005), Finnish politician

References

Danish feminine given names
Estonian feminine given names
Finnish-language surnames
Swedish feminine given names
Finnish feminine given names